|}

The Sole Power Sprint Stakes is a Listed flat horse race in Ireland open to thoroughbreds aged four years and older. It is run at the Curragh over a distance of 5 furlongs (1,006 metres), and it is scheduled to take place each year in May.

The race is named in tribute to the prolific Irish sprinter, Sole Power, and was first run in 2017.

Winners

See also
 Horse racing in Ireland
 List of Irish flat horse races

References

Racing Post:

Flat races in Ireland
Curragh Racecourse
Open sprint category horse races
Recurring sporting events established in 2017
2017 establishments in Ireland